Spy Museum refers to a museum who uses spying and espionage as its core content.

Spy museums include:
 Spyscape, a spy museum in New York, United States
 KGB Espionage Museum, in New York, United States (formerly KGB Spy Museum)
 International Spy Museum, in Washington D.C., United States
 Spy Museum, in Tampere, Finland
 Spy Museum Berlin, in Berlin, Germany
 CIA Museum, a spy museum in the CIA Headquarters, Virginia, United States

See also
:Category:Espionage museums